Qamar ul Islam (27 January 1948 – 18 September 2017), generally referred to as Qamar Sab was an Indian politician who was the Six-term Member of the Karnataka Legislative assembly, one-term Member of Parliament in the Lok Sabha from Kalaburagi and All India Congress Committee secretary (AICC) in-charge of Kerala. He served as the Cabinet Minister for Housing and Labour, Minister of Municipal Administration, Public Enterprises and Minister of Wakf and the MLA from Kalaburagi-North constituency for the state of Karnataka.

Early life and education
Qamar ul Islam was born to Noorul Islam in Kalaburagi. He completed his Bachelor's in Mechanical Engineering from PDA College of Engineering, Kalaburagi. He first stood in elections in PDA and became the president of the students' union, becoming the first and last Muslim student to hold the post of students' union president in PDA College.

Political career
He was a six-time MLA from the state of Karnataka. He started his political career with the Indian Union Muslim League (IUML) in 1978 and was elected to Karnataka Legislative Assembly during the terms 1978–83, 1989–1994, 1994–96, 1999–2004, 2008–2013 and 2013–2017. He was a Member of Parliament from 1996 to 1998 and also the cabinet minister for Housing and Labour in the administration led by Chief Minister S.M. Krishna from October 1999 to May 2004. He also served as cabinet minister for Municipal administration, Public Enterprises, Minority Development and waqf led by Chief Minister Siddaramaiah cabinet from May 2013 to June 2016.

Personal life
He was professionally an engineer. Dr Qamar ul Islam was passionate about Urdu and he also wrote Shayari sometimes. Throughout his life, he has presided in various Urdu literary programs.

Positions held
1978–1983 and 1989–1996 — Member, Karnataka Legislative Assembly
1979–1982 and 1992–1993 — Member, Public Accounts Committee
1990–1992 — Member, Estimates Committee
1993–1994 — Member, Committee on Petitions, Karnataka Legislative Assembly
1994–1996 — Member, Committee on Housing and Urban Development, Karnataka Legislative Assembly
1996 — Elected to Lok Sabha (Eleventh) MP
July 1996 onwards — General Secretary, J.D. Parliamentary Party

Death
Qamar ul Islam died on 18 September 2017 at a hospital in Bengaluru due to cardiogenic shock and multi-organ failure. He was admitted to the hospital 11 days earlier following cellulitis of the leg. His funeral procession was attended by Karnataka chief minister Siddaramaiah, Mallikarjun Kharge and others.

References

1948 births
2017 deaths
People from Kalaburagi
India MPs 1996–1997
Lok Sabha members from Karnataka
Karnataka MLAs 2008–2013
Indian National Congress politicians from Karnataka
Janata Dal politicians
PDA College of Engineering alumni